Roberto Mauri (born 1924) is an Italian actor, director and screenwriter.

Life and career 
Born Giuseppe Tagliavia in Castelvetrano, Trapani, Mauri began his career as a film actor in low-budget films, occasionally even playing main roles. He debuted as a director co-directing with Andrea Bianchi the crime film La legge del mitra, in which he was also an actor. Mainly active between the 1960s and the first half of the 1970s, Mauri specialized in the Spaghetti Western genre, in which he was sometimes credited as Robert Johnson.

Selected filmography  
Actor
 The Devil's Gondola (1946)
 The Opium Den (1947)
 They Were Three Hundred (1952)
 Francis the Smuggler (1953)
 La pattuglia dell'Amba Alagi (1953)

Director and screenwriter
 Slaughter of the Vampires (1962)
 Three Swords for Rome (1964)
 The Invincible Brothers Maciste (1964) 
 Night of Violence (1965)
 Vengeance Is My Forgiveness (1968) 
 Kong Island (1968) 
 Sartana in the Valley of Death (1970)
 Wanted Sabata (1970)
 He Was Called Holy Ghost (1971)
 Ivanhoe, the Norman Swordsman (1971)
 Madeleine: Anatomy of a Nightmare (1974)

References

External links 
 

1924 births
20th-century Italian male actors
Italian film directors
Italian male film actors
Italian screenwriters
Italian male screenwriters
People from Castelvetrano
Possibly living people